"Shattered" is a song by the English rock band the Rolling Stones from their 1978 album Some Girls. The song is a reflection of American lifestyles and life in 1970s-era New York City, but also influences from the English punk rock movement can be heard.

History
Recorded from October to December 1977, "Shattered" features lyrics sung in sprechgesang by Jagger on a guitar riff by Keith Richards. Jagger commented in a Rolling Stone interview that he wrote the lyrics in the back of a New York cab. Most of Richards' guitar work is a basic rhythmic pattern strumming out the alternating tonic and dominant chords with each bar, utilising a relatively modest phaser sound effect for some added depth. Due to the absence of bassist Bill Wyman, the bass track is played by Ronnie Wood.

Billboard stated that the "heavy bottom and...frenetic vocals translate New York's neurotic energy to music." Cash Box said that "the unique rhythmic undercurrents and Mick Jagger's harrowing chant-like vocals of life in the big Apple make this a top pop winner." Record World called it "rock 'n'
roll funk with a flourish."
 
In the United States, "Shattered" climbed to number 31 on the Billboard Hot 100.

Non-album B-side
The track "Everything Is Turning to Gold" was co-written with Ronnie Wood, who contributed lyrics inspired by the birth of his son.

Chart performance

Legacy
During a 2013 fundraiser, Eddie Vedder played the guitar while Jeanne Tripplehorn sang "Shattered" doing a Julie Andrews impression.

The title of the June 2019 book Can't Give It Away on Seventh Avenue: The Rolling Stones and New York City comes from a lyric in the song.

References

1977 songs
1978 singles
British disco songs
British punk rock songs
The Rolling Stones songs
Song recordings produced by Jagger–Richards
Songs about New York City
Songs written by Jagger–Richards